The following is a list of leaders of the Socialist Republic of Serbia (SR Serbia). It lists heads of state and heads of government. In the Socialist Republic, the only legal political party was the League of Communists of Serbia (SKS), which was part of the League of Communists of Yugoslavia (SKJ).

Commonly referred to as Socialist Serbia or simply as Serbia, SR Serbia was the largest, most populous, and most economically developed republic of the Yugoslavia in 1945–91.

Heads of State
Prior to 1974, Serbia had no president or state presidency. The most senior state official was the President of the People's Assembly of Serbia, who was considered as the head of state.

In the SR Serbia, the only legal political party was the League of Communists of Serbia, and therefore all heads of state belonged to that political organization.

Chairman of the ASNOS

Presidents of the People's Assembly

Presidents of the Presidency
In the SR Serbia, the only legal political party was the League of Communists of Serbia.

See also
List of heads of state of Serbia, for a comprehensive list of Serbian heads of state since 1804
President of Serbia
Prime Minister of Serbia
List of heads of state of Yugoslavia

References

Presidents
Socialist Republic of Serbia